Romanoff and Juliet may refer to:
 Romanoff and Juliet (play), a 1956 play by Peter Ustinov
 Romanoff and Juliet (1961 film), a film by Peter Ustinov based on his play
 Romanoff and Juliet (1964 film), an Australian television adaptation